Dnipro (Дніпро, English: Deep River) is a monthly colour literary magazine in Ukraine. Published as Dnipro since 1944, it has its origins in the Molodniak magazine of 1927. The magazine features prose, contemporary poetry, modern Ukrainian drama, interviews, and reviews.

The magazine is known for publishing the works of repressed artists and artists in exile during the Soviet era.  It also helped return a number of writers to Ukraine following the dissolution of the Soviet Union. In the mid-1990s, Dnipros editors published a four-volume collection of Ukrainian literary works which was distributed to libraries and universities.

History 

The magazine was founded during the Soviet era.  It began as Molodniak magazine (Молодняк; Young Generation) in 1927, founded by CC CLUYU (Ukrainian: ЦК ЛКСМУ; Lenin Communist Union of Youth of Ukraine) and published in Kharkiv, Ukraine SSR. It moved to Kyiv in 1935 and changed its name to Molodyi Bilshovyk (Молодий Більшовик; Young Bolsheviks) in 1937.  In 1944, it received its current title Dnipro (Дніпро, English: Deep River).

In the 1960s, the magazine gained some notoriety for including literary works of Lina Kostenko, Ivan Drach, Borys Oliynyk, Ivan Svitlichny, Ivan Dziuba, Hryhir Tiutiunnyk, and  – authors who suffered oppression and repression because of their beliefs yet remained faithful to their ideas.

The chief of the editorial board in 1984, became a well-known poet, lyricist, writer, and prizewinner of many Ukrainian and international literary awards.

In 1990, during the dissolution of the Soviet Union, the magazine was published with support from the Ukrainian Cultural Fund. In 1994, the magazine's editorial board published Ukainske Slovo, a four-volume collection of literature and critique that had appeared in the magazine.  From 2009, a limited company was registered for its publication.

The magazine continues to position itself as a youth publication.

Regular features

The magazine focuses on the tastes of contemporary readers, presenting material in the following forms:

 Prose – fantasy, mysticism, love stories, erotic, adventure materials, detective stories, and humour;
 Contemporary poetry – holding regular poetry contests to encourage new and surprising themes;
 Drama – modern Ukrainian plays, along with the articles that highlight the latest trends of the Ukrainian theatrical process; interviews with dramatists, producers and actors; articles dedicated to drama theory, genre classification, and reviews of the current theatrical festivals;
 Molodniak (Молодняк) – history of the formation of the periodical and broader literary heritage, historical events, and the lives of Ukrainian artists, poets and writers;
 Critical reviews – reviews of literary competitions, analytical articles on different subjects, topical outlines, analysis of one work of art published in the magazine;
 "Do VUS" – witty and apt Ukrainian synonyms;
 Nobelivka – creative work of world literature.

Authors and works published

Dnipro  provides a means for young writers to become known in literary circles, and for established writers to experiment in new themes. The periodical published the works of O. Iranets (critique of In Search of the Castaways), Borys Oliynyk, Oksana Zabuzhko (Off-site poem etc.), Max Kidruk (Class city narration), Moe pershe kuliove poranennia (My first bullet wound), Valeriy and Natalia Lapikury (detectives from the series Inspector i kava [Inspector and coffee]), Ihor Pavlyuk (Rezervatsiya [Reservation] novel),  critical article "" (Ukraine in search of detectives), and  fantasist Oleksiy Tymoshenko (Hudozhnyk [Artist] narration).

In their time it was Dnipro which published the poetry of Pavlo Tychyna, Maksym Rylsky, and Andriy Malyshko.

Also, Mykola Rudenko, Mykhailo Rudenko, Mykhailo Girnyk, K. Zhurba, Pavlo Zahrebelnyi, V. Tkachenko, V. Babliak, A. Horunzhyi, and A. Dimarov were among the authors of the magazine.

For the first time all literary works of Oleksandr Dovzhenko were published in Dnipro, and the author had been collaborating with the magazine until his last days. Dnipro printed the last novel of Mykhailo Stelmakh, Chotyry Brody (Four fords), which highlighted the events of Holodomor (1932–33).

Dnipro helped to return writers who were repressed and forgotten, who had been writing in Ukrainian outside of Ukraine: Olena Teliha, Ivan Bahrianyi (novels Sad Hetsymans'kyi [Hetman's garden], Tyhrolovy and Liudyna bizhyt’ nad prirvoyu [Human runs beyond the abyss]), Ulas Samchuk (novel Volyn, reminiscences  [On the white horse]), and Vasyl Barka and many others.

The magazine published a 4-volume reading book of 20th century Ukrainian literature and literary critique Ukrainske Slovo (Ukrainian Word) with the total printing of 600,000 copies sent to the libraries, schools and universities of Ukraine.

Literary critique
The articles by Ivan Dziuba, V. Ivanysenko, Ivan Svitlichny appeared at the end of the 50th - in the 60th; they inspected the current literary process and the creative works of particular writers. An interesting discussion took place on the pages of the magazine between I. Dziuba, M. Stelmakh and I. Boychak about the creative work of Vasil Zemliak.

In the 1980s, Dnipro printed the articles of V. Fashchenko, Lada Fedorovska, M. Shalata, V. Chuiko, Petro Yakovenko  etc. The magazine published the works "Sobor i navkolo niogo..." (Cathedral and round it....), "Sprava Vasylia Zakharchenka" (Case of Vasyl’ Zakharchenko), "Davaite pogovorymo vidverto..." (Let's speak frankly...), and "Sprava V. Ivanysenko" (Case of V. Ivanysenko) by V. Koval. The magazine printed the article called "Phenomen doby" (Phenomenon of age) by Vasyl Stus, poems "" (From the exercise-book of camp), non-published works of Vasyl Symonenko, poem from the archives of KDB "Atomnyi tsvyntar" (Atom cemetery) by Mykola Rudenko.

Illustrations
The magazine includes the illustrations and reproductions from the works of such painters as I. Ostafiychuck, Ivan Marchuk, M. Dakhna, and Vasyl Lopata.

In 2010, the magazine became fully coloured and illustrated; it opened new perspectives and possibilities for the presentation of fiction texts to the readers, being focused on the tastes of the contemporary reader.

Awards and competitions
Many works first published in the magazine were later honoured with the Lenin Prize, such as "Poema pro more" (Poem about see) by O. Dovzhenko). Published works also received the USSR state Shevchenko National Prize: novel "Chotyry brody" (Four fords) by V. Stelmakh, "" (Swan bevy) and "" (Green mills) by Vasil Zemliak).

The magazine was awarded by the Order of the Badge of Honour in 1977.

The Malyshko Award was established by the secretariat of CC LCUYU in 1982, and was awarded to Dnipro in recognition of the best works highlighting the present civil subjects that were published in the magazine.

References

Literature
 Molodyi Bilshovyk – Kyiv: Encyclopedic reference / Edited by A.V. Kudrytskyi. – Kyiv: Central editorial board of Ukrainian Soviet Encyclopedia, 1981. – 736 p., il.
 Dnipro – Kyiv: Encyclopedic reference / Edited by A.V. Kudrytskyi. - Kyiv: Central editorial board of Ukrainian Soviet Encyclopedia, 1981. – 736 p., il.
 Molodyi Bilshovyk – Ukrainian Soviet Encyclopedia. In 12 volumes. / Edited by Mykola Bazhan. – 2nd ed. – К., 1974–1985.
 Dnipro – Ukrainian Soviet Encyclopedia. In 12 volumes. / Edited by М. Bazhan. – 2nd ed. – К., 1974–1985.
 Dnipro – Dictionary/reference book of the history of modern literature edited by R.T. Gromyak, Yu. I. Kovaliova, V.I. Teremko – К.: EC "Akademiya" 2007
 “Ukrainske slovo”: Reading book of the Ukrainian literature and literary critique of 20th century in 3 volumes – К.: Ros’, 1994. (Libr. of “Dnipro” mag., –  Book 1 /Edited by V. Yaremenko, E. Fedorenko. – 1994 – 703 p.
 “Ukrainske slovo”: Reading book of the Ukrainian literature and literary critique of 20th century in 3 volumes – К.: Ros’, 1994. (Libr. of “Dnipro” mag., –  Book 1 /Edited by V. Yaremenko, E. Fedorenko. – 1994 – 719 p.
 “Ukrainske slovo”: Reading book of the Ukrainian literature and literary critique of 20th century in 3 volumes – К.: Ros’, 1994. (Libr. of “Dnipro” mag., –  Book 1 /Edited by V. Yaremenko, E. Fedorenko. – 1994 – 703 p.

External links
 dnipro-ukr.com.ua —site  
 dnipro-ukr.com.ua/forum — forum  

1927 establishments in Ukraine
Magazines established in 1927
Magazines published in Kyiv
Monthly magazines
Literary magazines published in Ukraine
Literary magazines published in the Soviet Union
Ukrainian-language magazines
Mass media in Kharkiv